Canarium acutifolium is a forest tree species, of the plant family Burseraceae, growing naturally in New Guinea, the Moluccas, Sulawesi, New Britain, New Ireland, Bougainville and in lowland north-eastern Queensland, Australia.

In 1917 botanist Elmer D. Merrill was the first to formally describe this species name, based on de Candolle's 1825 name Marignia acutifolia which was in turn based on earlier Rumphius's 1600s description from "Amboina", Ambon Island, in the Moluccas Islands. Furthermore, Merrill also based his description on a 1913 type specimen collection from Ambon by Robinson to represent Rumphius's Ambon description and on other synonymous names described in between these times.

The species has four recognised varieties, three have descriptions in Flora Malesiana and more recently in 2000 botanist Wayne Takeuchi described a new fourth variety of isolated known occurrence in New Guinea:
 C. acutifolium  var. acutifolium — New Guinea, Moluccas, New Britain, New Ireland, Bougainville, lowland Wet Tropics NE. Qld Australia
– differs from the other three varieties in flowers having 3 stamens instead of 6.
 C. acutifolium var. aemulans  — New Britain, NE. New Guinea
 C. acutifolium var. celebicum  — central Sulawesi
 C. acutifolium var. pioriverensis  — known only from lowland forest in the Crater Mt. area of New Guinea

In Australia, C. acutifolium var. acutifolium grows naturally below ca.  altitude in the scarce remaining lowland rainforests of the Wet Tropics region of north-eastern Queensland. These only known natural populations of the species in the nation have obtained the national and Qld governments' "vulnerable" species conservation status.

References

External links

acutifolium
Trees of New Guinea
Trees of the Maluku Islands
Trees of Sulawesi
Flora of Queensland
Sapindales of Australia